Fly wire, Fly-wire, Flywire or Fly Wire may refer to:

 Flywire (company), a former unicorn startup company
 Flywire (screen), a window screen of wire gaze
 Flywire (thread), a special thread construction used in sneaker manufacturing by Nike
 Fly-wire (wire), an enameled wire for circuit patching

See also
 Flying wire
 Fly by wire (disambiguation)
 Jumper wire
 Wrap wire